You Make Me Feel is the debut album of Canadian electronic musician Milosh. It was released on May 18, 2004, by Plug Research.

Track listing 
"You Make Me Feel" 4:43
"Your Taste" 3:24
"Simple People" 4:16
"Push" 3:18
"Creepy" 3:50
"Something Good" 3:02
"The Sky Is Grey" 5:41
"Your Voice" 3:36
"Do You Like Me" 3:14
"Time Steals the Day" 3:42
"Frozen Pieces" 4:21

References 

2008 albums
Milosh albums
Plug Research albums